In Mexico, the Secretary of Commerce and Industrial Development (Secretario de Comercio y Fomento Industrial) was the head of the extinct Secretariat of Commerce and Industrial Development (Secretaría de Comercio y Fomento Industrial or SECOFI)

The last Secretary of Commerce and Industrial Development was Herminio Blanco Mendoza

When President Vicente Fox took office the name of the SECOFI was changed to Secretariat of Economy (Secretaría de Economía or SE).

See also
Secretary of Economy

Former Mexican Executive Cabinet positions